"She Don't Want Nobody Near" is a single by American rock band Counting Crows from their greatest hits album, Films About Ghosts (The Best Of...). The song bases itself around the double negative of the title, and is a song about a girl who wants people around her.

Adam Duritz has said: "It’s just about people who are uncomfortable in the company of other people and also tired of being alone and they are trying to juggle those two opposing feelings. They are trying to figure out how to live that way."

Charts

References

2003 singles
2003 songs
Counting Crows songs
Geffen Records singles
Songs written by Adam Duritz
Songs written by Charlie Gillingham
Songs written by Dan Vickrey
Songs written by David Bryson
Songs written by David Immerglück